Abala-Ibeme or Abala is a village in Obingwa local government area in Abia State, Nigeria.

References 

Populated places in Abia State
Villages in Igboland